Berge's Cabinet was the government of Norway from 30 May 1923 to 25 July 1924. The cabinet was led by Prime Minister Abraham Berge. It succeeded Otto Bahr Halvorsen's second cabinet following his death, and was composed of mostly the same ministers as its predecessor. The cabinet resigned on 23 July 1924, with effect two days later, after not getting wide support in the Storting for a alcohol ban. It was succeeded by Johan L. Mowinckel's first cabinet.

Cabinet ministers
The cabinet stayed mostly intact through Berge's term. The only changes was Christian Lange Rolfsen stepping in as Minister of Justice, and Karl Sanne as Minister of Education and Church Affairs following the death of Ivar B. Sælen in November 1923. 

|}

Notes

References

Berge
Cabinets established in 1923
Cabinets disestablished in 1924